This is a recap of the 1960 season for the Professional Bowlers Association (PBA) Tour.  It was the tour's second season. It consisted of seven events, including the first PBA National Championship, now known as the PBA World Championship. Don Carter won this event among his two titles on the season.

Tournament schedule

The PBA tour's first event of the season, the second annual Empire State PBA open, was held at Schade's Academy, in Albany, New York. The season opened up on May 13, 1960. 28 bowlers cashed in this competition. Dick Weber won the first PBA event of the season, and his third consecutive.

Leading money winners

External links
1960 Season Schedule

Professional Bowlers Association seasons
1960 in bowling